Fagerhaug Church is a parish church of the Church of Norway in Oppdal municipality in Trøndelag county, Norway. It is located in the village of Fagerhaug in the northern part of Oppdal. It is the church for the Fagerhaug parish which is part of the Gauldal prosti (deanery) in the Diocese of Nidaros. The red, wooden church was built in a long church style in 1921. The church seats about 150 people.

History
The church was built in 1921 as a Baptist church called . It was used as a prayer house by the Baptist congregation from 1921 until 1928. After that, it was used for a variety of purposes. During the 1950s, it was purchased by the local Church of Norway parish. From 1958-1959, the building was renovated by Ola Mjøen using plans drawn up by the architect John Egil Tverdahl. The building was consecrated as a chapel on 13 September 1959 and it later became designated as a parish church.

See also
List of churches in Nidaros

References

Oppdal
Churches in Trøndelag
Long churches in Norway
Wooden churches in Norway
20th-century Church of Norway church buildings
Churches completed in 1921
1959 establishments in Norway